The 2023 Bengaluru Open was a professional tennis tournament played on hard courts. It was the sixth edition of the tournament which was part of the 2023 ATP Challenger Tour. It took place in Bangalore, India from 20 to 26 February 2023.

Singles main-draw entrants

Seeds

 1 Rankings are as of 13 February 2023.

Other entrants
The following players received wildcards into the singles main draw:
  Leo Borg
  S D Prajwal Dev
  Sumit Nagal

The following player received entry into the singles main draw using a protected ranking:
  Marc Polmans

The following player received entry into the singles main draw as an alternate:
  Harold Mayot

The following players received entry from the qualifying draw:
  Prajnesh Gunneswaran
  Jason Jung
  Alibek Kachmazov
  James McCabe
  Nikola Milojević
  Giovanni Mpetshi Perricard

The following player received entry as a lucky loser:
  Yasutaka Uchiyama

Champions

Singles

  Max Purcell def.  James Duckworth 3–6, 7–5, 7–6(7–5).

Doubles

  Chung Yun-seong /  Hsu Yu-hsiou def.  Anirudh Chandrasekar /  Vijay Sundar Prashanth 3–6, 7–6(9–7), [11–9].

References

2023 ATP Challenger Tour
2023
February 2023 sports events in India
2023 in Indian sport